Sound system may refer to:

Technology Media 
 Sound reinforcement system, a system for amplifying audio for an audience or live performance.
 High fidelity, a sound system intended for accurate reproduction of music in the home, volume adjustments.
 Public address system, an institutional speech-reinforcement or public safety announcement system, technical gestures
 Shelf stereo, Technological innovation system a compact sound system for personal use.
•   Amplifier

Arts and entertainment
 Sound system (DJ), a group of disc jockeys performing together
 Sound system (Jamaican), a group of disc jockeys, engineers and MCs playing ska, rocksteady or reggae music
 Sound System Records, an Australian record label
 LCD Soundsystem, an American rock band
 Sound System (album), by The Clash
 Sound System: The Final Releases, a 2021 EP by Bad Gyal
 Sound-System (album), by Herbie Hancock
 Soundsystem (311 album), 1999
 "Sound System", a song by Operation Ivy

See also
Phonology, the study of sound systems of languages